Chogha Soleyman (also Romanized as Choghā Soleymān; also known as Choghā Salmān) is a village in Mamulan Rural District, Mamulan District, Pol-e Dokhtar County, Lorestan Province, Iran. At the 2006 census, its population was 216, in 45 families.

References 

Towns and villages in Pol-e Dokhtar County